The Philopteridae are a family of Ischnocera, chewing lice mostly parasitic on birds.

The taxonomy and systematics of the group are in need of revision; the Philopteridae are almost certainly paraphyletic.

Genera
Some notable species are also listed.

 Acidoproctus
 Acutifrons
 Aegypoecus
 Alcedoecus
 Alcedoffula
 Anaticola
 Anatoecus
 Aquanirmus
 Ardeicola
 Ardeiphagus
 Auricotes
 Austrogoniodes
 Austrophilopterus
 Bedfordiella
 Bizarrifrons
 Bobdalglieshia
 Bothriometopus
 Brueelia
 Bucerocophorus
 Buceroemersonia
 Buceronirmus
 Bucorvellus
 Buerelius
 Campanulotes
 Capraiella
 Caracaricola
 Carduiceps
 Centropodiella
 Chelopistes
 Cirrophthirius
 Colilipeurus
 Colinicola
 Coloceras
 Columbicola
 Columbicola extinctus
 Cotingacola
 Craspedonirmus
 Craspedorrhynchus
 Cuclotocephalus
 Cuclotogaster
 Cuculicola
 Cuculoecus
 Cummingsiella
 Dahlemhornia
 Degeeriella
 Discocorpus
 Docophorulus
 Echinophilopterus
 Emersoniella
 Episbates
 Esthiopterum Harrison, 1916
 Esthiopterum Fabricius, 1794
 Esthiopterum Scopoli, 1763
 Falcolipeurus
 Falcolius
 Forficuloecus
 Formicaphagus
 Formicaricola
 Fulicoffula
 Furnariphilus
 Galliphilopterus
 Goniocotes
 Goniodes
 Haffneria
 Halipeurus
 Harrisoniella
 Harrisoniella hopkinsi
 Heptapsogaster
 Hopkinsiella
 Ibidoecus
 Incidifrons
 Kelloggia
 Kodocephalon 
 Labicotes
 Lagopoecus
 Lamprocorpus
 Leipoiella
 Lipeurus
 Lunaceps
 Malaulipeurus
 Megaginus
 Megapeostus
 Megapodiella
 Meinertzhageniella
 Melibrueelia
 Meropoecus
 Mulcticola
 Nakicola
 Naubates
 Neophilopterus
 Neopsittaconirmus
 Nesiotinus
 Nothocotus
 Nyctibicola
 Ornicholax
 Ornithobius
 Osculotes
 Otidoecus
 Oxylipeurus
 Pachyskelotes
 Paraclisis
 Paragoniocotes
 Paroncophorus
 Passonomedea
 Pectenosoma
 Pectinopygus
 Pelmatocerandra
 Penenirmus
 Perineus
 Philoceanus
 Philopteroides
 Philopterus
 Physconella
 Physconelloides
 Picicola
 Podargoecus
 Pseudocophorus
 Pseudolipeurus
 Pseudonirmus
 Pseudophilopterus
 Psittaconirmus
 Psittoecus
 Pterocotes
 Quadraceps
 Rallicola Johnston & Harrison, 1911
 Rallicola extinctus
 Rhopaloceras
 Rhynonirmus
 Rotundiceps
 Saemundssonia
 Splendoroffula
 Strigiphilus
 Strigiphilus garylarsoni
 Strongylocotes
 Struthiolipeurus
 Sturnidoecus
 Syrrhaptoecus
 Theresiella
 Tinamotaecola
 Trabeculus
 Trichodopeostus
 Trichophilopterus
 Trogoniella
 Trogoninirmus
 Turnicola
 Turturicola
 Upupicola
 Vernoniella
 Wilsoniella

References 

Lice
Insect families